"Mob Ties" is a song by Canadian rapper Drake from his album, Scorpion (2018). It was released as the seventh single from the album on January 6, 2019. The song was produced by Boi-1da and Allen Ritter. The song features additional background vocals by Asheley Turner. It reached the top 20 in Canada and the United States.

Composition
"Mob Ties" is a trap song that contains samples from Nas's song "Affirmative Action" (1996).

Commercial performance

North America
On July 14, 2018, "Mob Ties" entered the charts at number 11 and spent 13 weeks on the Billboard Canadian Hot 100 and remained in the top 100 until October 6, 2018. The song spent eight weeks on the US Billboard Hot 100, entering the charts at number 13, its immediate peak, on July 14, 2018.

Internationally
The song has peaked in the top 40 in Australia, Greece, Portugal and has charted on the charts of Austria, France, Germany, the Netherlands, Slovakia, and Sweden.

Charts

Weekly charts

Year-end charts

Certifications

Release history

References

2018 songs
2019 singles
Drake (musician) songs
Songs written by Drake (musician)
Songs written by Boi-1da
Songs written by Allen Ritter
Songs written by Samuel Barnes (songwriter)
Songs written by Nas
Songs written by Jean-Claude Olivier
Song recordings produced by Allen Ritter
Songs written by Foxy Brown (rapper)
Songs written by Vory
Trap music songs